The Huahujing (formerly written Hua Hu Ching) is a Taoist work, traditionally attributed to Laozi (formerly written Lao Tzu).

Two unrelated versions are claimed to exist, a partial manuscript discovered in the Mogao Caves, Dunhuang, in China and a modern English rendering from oral tradition, while some scholars believe the whole work to be a later work from the 4th century CE.

Origins
The work is honorifically known as the Taishang lingbao Laozi huahu miaojing ("The Supreme Numinous Treasure's Sublime Classic on Laozi's Conversion of the Barbarians").

Traditionally, it is said that Laozi wrote it with the intention of converting Buddhists to Taoism, when they began to cross over from India. The Taoists are sometimes claimed to have developed the Huahujing to support one of their favourite arguments against the Buddhists: that after leaving China to the West, Laozi had travelled as far as India, where he had converted—or even become—the Buddha and thus Buddhism had been created as a somewhat distorted offshoot of Taoism.

Some scholars believe it is a forgery because there are no historical references to it until the early 4th century CE. It has been suggested that the Taoist  may have originally compiled the Huahujing circa 300 CE.

Destruction of copies
In 705, the Emperor Zhongzong of Tang prohibited distribution of the text.

Emperors of China occasionally organized debates between Buddhists and Taoists, and granted political favor to the winners. An emperor ordered all copies to be destroyed in the 13th century after Taoists lost a debate with Buddhists.

Dunhuang manuscript
Parts of chapters 1, 2, 8 and 10 have been discovered among the Dunhuang manuscripts, recovered from the Mogao Caves near Dunhuang and preserved in the Taisho Tripitaka, manuscript 2139.

Estimated dates for the manuscript range from around the late 4th or early 5th century to the 6th century CE Northern Celestial Masters.

Its contents have no direct relation to later oral texts available in English.

Oral tradition
The work is said to have survived in oral tradition. A full translation into English by the Taoist priest Hua-Ching Ni was published in 1979. He claimed to have derived his translation from the preservation of the Huahujing through oral tradition, having been handed down through generations of Taoist priests.

Hua-Ching Ni's translation contains exactly the same number of chapters, 81, as his translation of the Tao Te Ching although it is slightly longer. It takes the form of a narrative question-and-answer dialogue between a disciple Prince and his learned Master. Thematically the text covers much of the original ground of the Tao Te Ching elucidating on the concept of the Tao. However it goes much further in elaborating the relationship of Taoism to other aspects of traditional Chinese culture such as holistic medicine, feng shui, tai chi and the I Ching, not all of which existed in the time of Laozi. It also gives more detailed advice on Taoist philosophy, meditation and other practices. It also includes some reinterpretation for the modern world, for example it refers to the four fundamental forces of modern physics, giving their individual modern names and relating them to the four fundamental forces identified in Taoist philosophy.

Based on the teachings of Hua-Ching Ni, a shorter English-language text claiming to be the  Huahujing has been written by Brian Walker. His version is in a spare, poetic form reminiscent of many translations of the Tao Te Ching.

References

Notes

Bibliography
 Komjathy, Louis; Daoist Texts in Translation. 2004.
Liu Yi. "Towards a New Understanding of Huahujing (The scripture of transforming the barbarians) from Dunhuang" International Dunhuang Project Newsletter 7. 1997.
Ni Hua-Ching. The Complete Works of Lao Tzu: Tao Teh Ching & Hua Hu Ching, The Shrine of the Eternal Breath of Tao and the College of Tao and Traditional healing, 1979. (New edition SevenStar Communications. 1997. )
Walker, Brian. Hua Hu Ching: Unknown Teachings of Lao Tzu. San Francisco: Harper. 1995. 
 Weinstein, Stanley. 1987. Buddhism under the T’ang. Cambridge: Cambridge University Press.
Welch, Holmes.  Taoism: The Parting of the Way. Boston: Beacon Press. 1957.

External links
Hua Hu Ching, first 10 chapters translated by Brian Walker, with an introduction.
Derek Lin, "Hua Hu Ching", Misconceptions, taoism.net, 4 May 2013. (Retrieved 25 August 2018)

Buddhism in China
Taoist texts
Taoism in China
4th century in religion
4th-century books
4th century in China